Manchester Central is a parliamentary constituency in Greater Manchester created in 1974 represented in the House of Commons of the UK Parliament since 2012 by Lucy Powell of the Labour Party and Co-operative Party.

Constituency profile
The seat covers the city centre and all its major attractions and both of Manchester's large universities, and fringe areas such as Hulme and Ancoats which have undergone extensive regeneration since the 1990s, an example of which is the New Islington development. Flats in the city centre can sell for several million pounds while there are more deprived areas to the east, including Moston, Beswick and Ardwick. There is a high proportion of graduates and students in the city centre, and the constituency as a whole has the highest proportion of Chinese people in the country. Moss Side is home to a large Afro-Caribbean population.

This constituency has always (since its 1974 creation) been a safe Labour seat. The current MP Lucy Powell won the seat in a by-election in November 2012 on a turnout of just 18%, the lowest since the Second World War. Twelve candidates stood, considerably more than the six who stood in the 1979 by-election.

History
Creation
The main forerunner to the seat was Manchester Cheetham, entirely taken into this area; three of five wards of former seat Manchester Exchange completed the first set of boundaries of the seat. The seat (including predecessor seats) has been held by the Labour Party since 1945.

Political history
Labour candidates have won Manchester Central by a decidedly non-marginal majority since its 1974 creation. The current MP Lucy Powell won the seat at a by-election in November 2012 on a turnout of 18%; the lowest since the Second World War.

Results of other parties

The 2015 general election saw greater-than-national-average swing of +3.4% (by a swing of +6.2%) to the Green Party candidate, achieving third place.  Followed next by UKIP in 2015 by number of votes cast (prior to the UK EU membership referendum 2016, votes cast for the Liberal Democrats — who for two periods had been the runner-up party in Manchester Central — for the first time placed its candidate in fifth place. The Conservative Party returned to second place in 2015 through candidate Xingang Wang (achieving 13.5% of the vote); its second place of 1979 was through its best polling to date of 22.1% of the vote. The maximal second place to date was 2010, through Liberal Democrat candidate, Marc Ramsbottom, taking 26.6% of the vote.

Turnout 
Turnout has changed from a national low within the 2010 general election (of 46.7%) to 55.1% of electors. The greatest turnout was in 1987, with 63.9%.

Boundaries 

1974–1983: The County Borough of Manchester wards of Beswick, Cheetham, Collegiate Church, Harpurhey, and Miles Platting.

1983–1997: The City of Manchester wards of Ardwick, Beswick and Clayton, Bradford, Central, Cheetham, Hulme, and Newton Heath.

1997–2010: As above, less Cheetham, plus Moss Side, and Whalley Range.

2010–: The City of Manchester wards of Ancoats & Clayton, Ardwick, Bradford, City Centre, Hulme, Miles Platting & Newton Heath, Moss Side, and Moston using the 2004-2018 boundaries.

In 2018 the Local Government Boundary Commission for England (LGBCE) implemented changes to Manchester's electoral wards. For the purposes of parliamentary elections the 2004-2018 ward boundaries are used.

Members of Parliament

Elections

Elections in the 2010s 

''This was the lowest turnout for any constituency in the whole of the United Kingdom

Elections in the 2000s

Elections in the 1990s

Elections in the 1980s

Elections in the 1970s

See also 
 List of parliamentary constituencies in Greater Manchester

Notes

References

Central
Constituencies of the Parliament of the United Kingdom established in 1974
Parliamentary constituencies in North West England